Burdeki is a rural locality (a selo) and the administrative centre of Burdekinskoye Rural Settlement, Sergokalinsky District, Republic of Dagestan, Russia. The population was 652 as of 2010. There is 1 street.

Geography 
Burdeki is located 23 km south of Sergokala (the district's administrative centre) by road, on the Burdekikherk River. Kichi-Gamri and Nizhneye Makhargimakhi are the nearest rural localities.

Nationalities 
Dargins live there.

References 

Rural localities in Sergokalinsky District